Kenichi Kiyomiya (born 1 November 1967) is a Japanese former professional tennis player.

Kiyomiya was trained in the United States, where he arrived at a young age in the late 1970s.

In 1988 he represented Japan in a Davis Cup tie against Thailand in Bangkok. Japan won the tie, a relegation play-off, but Kiyomiya lost his doubles rubber, partnering Shigeru Ota.

Following his retirement from the tour he transitioned into coaching.

See also
List of Japan Davis Cup team representatives

References

External links
 
 
 

1967 births
Living people
Japanese male tennis players
20th-century Japanese people